Çamyuva (pronounced Chamyoova) is a small town in the district of Kemer, Antalya Province, Turkey, situated to the south of the central town of Kemer. Formerly a village without a municipal administration, it was recently merged with the neighbouring village of Kiriş and the official name for the two agglomerations, as well as the name of the constituted municipality, is Çamyuva. Although during the past few years much construction has occurred, these two towns are still famous for numerous olive and orange groves.

The base station of the Olympos Aerial Tram is located nearby Çamyuva.

Antalya
Turkish Riviera
Towns in Turkey